Buchenhain station is a railway station in the municipality of Baierbrunn, in Bavaria, Germany. It is located on the Isar Valley line of Deutsche Bahn.

Services
 the following services stop at Buchenhain:

References

External links
 
 Buchenhain layout 
 

Railway stations in Bavaria
Buildings and structures in Munich (district)
Munich S-Bahn stations